Rasmi Khalidovich Djabrailov (8 December 1932 —  22 January 2022) was a Russian actor and stage director. Djabrailov was born on 8 December 1932. He was declared an Honored Artist of the RSFSR in 1987. Djabrailov died on 22 January 2022, at the age of 89 from COVID-19.

References

External links 

1932 births
2022 deaths
Soviet male actors
Russian male actors
20th-century Russian male actors
People from Suleyman-Stalsky District
Soviet male film actors
Russian male film actors
Soviet theatre directors
Soviet male stage actors
Russian male stage actors
Recipients of the Medal of the Order "For Merit to the Fatherland" II class
Honored Artists of the RSFSR
Deaths from the COVID-19 pandemic in Russia

Russian Academy of Theatre Arts alumni
Russian people of Lezgian descent